The 1997 Beach Soccer World Championships was the third edition of the Beach Soccer World Championships, the most prestigious competition in international beach soccer contested by men's national teams until 2005, when the competition was then replaced by the second iteration of a world cup in beach soccer, the better known FIFA Beach Soccer World Cup. It was organised by Brazilian sports agency Koch Tavares (one of the founding partners of Beach Soccer Worldwide). 

For the third consecutive time, the tournament took place at Copacabana Beach in Rio de Janeiro, Brazil. 

Hosts Brazil won the tournament for the third time in a row by beating Uruguay 5–2 in what was a repeat of the final in the previous edition. It was also the first and only time in the history of the world cup that no European nations finished in the top four. 

Future champions France and Portugal both competed for the first time at this edition, as did the first Asian nation, Japan.

Organisation
The organisation remained the same as the format established during the championship's inception in 1995; the eight participating nations competed in two groups of four teams in a round robin format. The top two teams progressed straight to the semi-finals from which point on the championship was played as a knock-out tournament until a winner was crowned with an additional match to determine third place.

The capacity of the arena used for this edition of the World Championships was scaled down from the 12,000 seats available in the two previous events, to 7,000 for this year's tournament.

Teams
Africa and Oceania were unrepresented.

Asian Zone (1):
1

European Zone (3):
1

1

North American Zone (1):

South American Zone (2):

Hosts:
 (South America)
Notes:
1. Teams making their debut

Group stage

Group A

Group B

Knockout stage

Semi-finals

Third place play-off

Final

Winners

Awards

Final standings

Sources

RSSSF
Roonba

1997
1997
1997 in beach soccer
1997 in Brazilian football